Vigolo is a comune (municipality) in the Province of Bergamo in the Italian region of Lombardy, located about  northeast of Milan and about  east of Bergamo.

Vigolo borders the following municipalities: Adrara San Martino, Adrara San Rocco, Fonteno, Parzanica, Predore, Tavernola Bergamasca, Viadanica.

Demographic evolution

References